Ullíbarri-Arrazua in Spanish or Uribarri Arrazua in basque is a village in Álava, Basque Country, Spain.

Populated places in Álava